Alkalibacillus salilacus is a bacterium from the genus Alkalibacillus.

References

Bacillaceae
Bacteria described in 2005